Taigwynion is a hamlet 1 km ENE of Llandre in Ceredigion, Wales. It has 11 houses and a postcode of its own, SY24 5AG.

Toponymy
Taigwynion has no English name and is formed as a compound name from the Welsh word 'tai', plural of 'ty' (house) and 'gwynion' (white). The English translation of Taigwynion is 'White Houses'  which suggests that the original houses were whitewashed. The hamlet was well-established prior to the first census records in 1841.

Geography
Borth,  Ynyslas and the north end of Llandre are the only immediate habitations visible from Taigwynion. The Llŷn Peninsula from Mynydd y Rhiw to Criccieth is  visible on the horizon. As an inhabitation it is well connected by a series of footpaths to Llandre, Glanfread to the north and by a  bridleway eastwards to Pwllglas. It is located on the 75 m contour and faces the northwest.

A stream arising on land belonging to Pwllglas farm above Taigwynion runs through Taigwynion and Llandre to join the River Ceiro at Aberceiro, south of Llandre. It is piped under the road for most of its course through Llandre and only reappears immediately south of Llandre itself alongside the railway.

History
Historically it was populated by agricultural labourers, weavers and carpenters.

The poet and former Archdruid John James Williams was born in Taigwynion.

Dwellings
The houses are a mix of relatively new and older houses. The last new house was occupied in 1993.

Events
 Riverside Caravan Park, 0.5 km north of Taigwynion, was flooded after the June 9, 2013 rain and received widespread coverage in the media.
 Farmbox Meats Ltd, 0.5 km northwest of Taigwynion, was raided in the horsemeat scandal.

References

Villages in Ceredigion